The Civic Democratic Party (ODS) leadership election of 2016 was a part of party's congress. The incumbent leader Petr Fiala was unopposed. Fiala was re-elected when he received 93% of votes from delegates.

Background 
Petr Fiala is the leader of ODS since 2014 when he defeated Miroslava Němcová. In 2016, he received nomination from all 13 regional organisations and his reelection was considered certain. Fiala ran uncontested. Fiala's leadership was praised for saving the party because ODS suffered heavy losses in 2013 and there was a threat that party could lose its parliamentary seats in future. Fiala managed to stabilise party's support.

Voting

References

2016
2016 elections in the Czech Republic
Single-candidate elections
Indirect elections
Elections in Ostrava
Civic Democratic Party leadership election